During the 1991–92 season, Olympique de Marseille competed in the French Division 1 as three-time reigning champions, the 1991–92 Coupe de France and the 1991–92 European Cup.

Squad

Goalkeeper
 Pascal Olmeta

Defence
 Manuel Amoros
 Jocelyn Angloma
 Pascal Baills
 Basile Boli
 Bernard Casoni
 Marcel Desailly
 Eric Di Meco
 Carlos Mozer

Midfield
 Alain Boghossian
 Didier Deschamps
 Jean-Philippe Durand
 Patrice Eyraud
 Jean-Christophe Marquet
 Franck Sauzée
 Trevor Steven
 Dragan Stojkovic (on loan)

Attack
 Marc Libbra
 Jean-Pierre Papin
 Abedi Pele
 Chris Waddle
 Daniel Xuereb

Management
 Tomislav Ivic, later   Raymond Goethals(Coach)

Competitions

Division 1

League table

Results summary

Results by round

Coupe de France

Semi-finals

European Cup

First round

Marseille won 10–0 on aggregate.

Second round

Marseille 4–4 Sparta Prague on aggregate. Sparta Prague won on away goals.

References

Olympique de Marseille seasons
Olympique de Marseille
French football championship-winning seasons